
Gmina Czarny Bór is a rural gmina (administrative district) in Wałbrzych County, Lower Silesian Voivodeship, in south-western Poland.

Neighbouring gminas
Gmina Czarny Bór is bordered by the town of Boguszów-Gorce and the gminas of Kamienna Góra, Marciszów, Mieroszów and Stare Bogaczowice.

Villages
The gmina contains the villages of Borówno, Czarny Bór, Grzędy, Grzędy Górne, Jaczków and Witków.

Twin towns – sister cities

Gmina Czarny Bór is twinned with:
 Grand-Champ, France
 Nechanice, Czech Republic
 Vilnius District Municipality, Lithuania

References

Czarny Bor
Wałbrzych County